The 2014–15 season was the 65th season in which Crawley Town played senior football, and the 9th as a fully professional team. Crawley Town competed in Football League One, the third tier of English football, following automatic promotion from League Two during the 2011–12 season.

Season summary
The 2014–15 season saw Crawley struggle for form, and Gregory resigned for health reasons near the end of 2014, with the club in the relegation zone. Dean Saunders was appointed to replace him on an interim basis, and despite an upturn in form, was unable to get the club out of trouble. On Sunday 3 May 2015, Crawley were relegated to League Two, following a 1–2 defeat at home to Coventry City. Saunders' short-term deal was not renewed after the season ended, and he was replaced by Mark Yates.

First team squad
Players' ages are as of 1 August 2014.

Match details

Pre-season friendlies

League One

League table

Matches
The fixtures for the 2014–15 season were announced on 18 June 2014 at 9am.

FA Cup

The draw for the first round of the FA Cup was made on 27 October 2014.

League Cup

The draw for the first round was made on 17 June 2014 at 10am. Crawley Town were drawn at home to Ipswich Town.

Football League Trophy

Transfers

In

Out

Loans in

Loans out

References

Crawley Town F.C. seasons
Crawley Town